The 2016 Valencian Community motorcycle Grand Prix was the eighteenth and last round of the 2016 Grand Prix motorcycle racing season. It was held at the Circuit Ricardo Tormo in Valencia on 13 November 2016. 

The MotoGP class race saw the début of the KTM RC16, in preparation for its full season début in 2017.

Classification

MotoGP

Moto2

Moto3

Championship standings after the race (MotoGP)
Below are the standings for the top five riders and constructors after round eighteen has concluded.

Riders' Championship standings

Constructors' Championship standings

 Note: Only the top five positions are included for both sets of standings.

References

2016 MotoGP race reports
Valencian Motorcycle Grand Prix
Valencian Community motorcycle Grand Prix
21st century in Valencia
Valencian motorcycle Grand Prix